Cassidy Krug (born July 12, 1985) is an American diver from Pittsburgh, Pennsylvania.

Krug competed in the 2012 Summer Olympics classifying 7th in the women's 3 m springboard after ranking 5th in the semifinals. During the 2011 Pan American Games she has won a silver medal in the 3 m individual competition and a bronze in the synchronized event from the same height alongside her partner Kassidy Cook.

References

External links
 Cassidy Krugs' profile on the London 2012 Olympics website 

1985 births
Living people
Sportspeople from Pittsburgh
Divers at the 2011 Pan American Games
Divers at the 2012 Summer Olympics
Olympic divers of the United States
American female divers
Pan American Games silver medalists for the United States
Pan American Games bronze medalists for the United States
Pan American Games medalists in diving
Medalists at the 2011 Pan American Games
21st-century American women